Işıl is a common feminine Turkish given name. In Turkish, "Işıl" means "Shining", "Sparkling", "Bright", "Brilliant", "Ablaze". It is often used to describe something magnificent, shining, or sparkling a lot. People named Işıl include:

People
Ayşe Işıl Karakaş (born 1958), Turkish academic, professor of law, and international judge of the European Court of Human Rights in respect of the Republic of Turkey.
Işıl Alben (born 1986), Turkish professional female basketball player of Galatasaray Medical Park.
Işıl Yücesoy (born 1945), Turkish singer and actress

Turkish feminine given names